Reginald Jordan (born January 26, 1968) is an American former professional basketball player and coach. Born in Chicago, Illinois, he attended Proviso East High School, in Maywood, Illinois. The 6'4" (1.93 m) and 195 lb (88 kg) guard went to Southwestern Junior College, and then to New Mexico State University. Jordan was never drafted by an NBA team but played in the Continental Basketball Association and won 2 championships with the Yakima Sun Kings and the Sioux Falls Skyforce. Jordan also played in Greece top league for 2 seasons 1994-95, 2002. Jordan also managed to play in 6 NBA seasons from 1993 to 1994 and from 1996 to 2000. He played for the Los Angeles Lakers, Atlanta Hawks, Portland Trail Blazers, Minnesota Timberwolves and Washington Wizards. In the CBA, he also played for the Grand Rapids Hoops and Rockford Lightning.

In his NBA career, Jordan played in 186 games. On February 3, 1994 as a member of the Lakers, Jordan scored a career high 28 points versus the Utah Jazz. Jordan finished his professional career playing in Mexico top League LNBP from 2004-2010 before retiring. Jordan then became Head coach for Fuerza Regia of Monterrey 2010-2013.

References

External links
NBA stats @ basketballreference.com
at esake.gr

1968 births
Living people
African-American basketball players
American expatriate basketball people in Canada
American expatriate basketball people in Greece
American expatriate basketball people in Mexico
American men's basketball players
Apollon Patras B.C. players
Atlanta Hawks players
Basketball coaches from Illinois
Basketball players from Chicago
Cometas de Querétaro players
Dafnis B.C. players
Grand Rapids Hoops players
Harlem Globetrotters players
Lechugueros de León players
Los Angeles Lakers players
Minnesota Timberwolves players
New Mexico State Aggies men's basketball players
Point guards
Portland Trail Blazers players
Rockford Lightning players
Shooting guards
Sioux Falls Skyforce (CBA) players
Southwestern Jaguars men's basketball players
Undrafted National Basketball Association players
Washington Wizards players
Yakima Sun Kings players
21st-century African-American people
20th-century African-American sportspeople